Demetrida picipennis is a species of ground beetle in Lebiinae subfamily. It was described by Chaudoir in 1852 and is endemic to Australia.

References

Beetles described in 1872
Beetles of Australia
picipennis